In the temporal bone at the sides of the skull, above and between the aquæductus vestibuli is an irregular depression which lodges a process of the dura mater and transmits a small vein and the subarcuate artery a branch of the meatal segment of anterior inferior cerebellar artery, which is an end artery that supplies blood to the inner ear; in the infant this depression is represented by a large fossa, the subarcuate fossa, which extends backward as a blind tunnel under the superior semicircular canal.

It is extensive in most primates (except for great apes) and nearly all mammals. In these animals, the subarcuate fossa houses a part of the cerebellum, the petrosal lobe.

References

External links
 

Bones of the head and neck